DYAS (106.1 FM), broadcasting as 106.1 Like Radio, is a radio station owned and operated by Capitol Broadcasting Center in the Philippines. The station's studio is located at Brgy. Mambajao, Maasin, while its transmitter is located at Brgy. Ichon, Macrohon, Southern Leyte.

References

Radio stations established in 2010
Radio stations in Southern Leyte